Valla is both a surname and place name which may refer to:

People
Esat Valla, Kosovar Albanian painter 
Gerd-Liv Valla, Norwegian trade union leader
Giorgio Valla (1447-1500), scientist
Kristin Valla, Norwegian writer and journalist 
Kristin Hille Valla, Norwegian politician for the Centre Party 
Lorenzo Valla (1406 – 1457), Italian Renaissance era humanist
Marie-Laure Valla, French set dresser and set decorator
Natacha Valla, French economist 
Nerduan Valla, Albanian ice hockey player
Paul Vallas, American politician 
Spyros Vallas, Greek professional football player
Trebisonda Valla (1916 – 2006), Italian athlete

Places
 Valla (Dhaalu Atoll), an uninhabited island of the Maldives
 Valla (Pieria), a town of ancient Pieria, Macedonia, Greece
 Valla, Norway in Vega municipality, Nordland, Norway
 Vallsjøen (Valla) in Meløy municipality, Nordland, Norway
 Valla, New South Wales, a village in New South Wales, Australia 
 Valla, Sweden, locality situated in Katrineholm Municipality, Södermanland County, Sweden
 Valla, locality in Linköping Municipality, Östergötland County, Sweden 
 East Valla
 West Valla
 Valla Wood, nature reserve in the municipality of Linköping
 Stora Valla, multi-use stadium in Degerfors, Sweden

Other
 Plural for Vallum, the whole or a portion of the fortifications of a Roman camp
Valla, a player character in the video game Heroes of the Storm

Norwegian-language surnames
Italian-language surnames